William Ashley Harrold (born 3 May 1988) is an English professional golfer.

Harrold played college golf at the University of Missouri. He turned professional in 2012 and played on mini-tours including the PGA EuroPro Tour and MENA Golf Tour winning three events. His first win on a major tour was the 2014 Belgian Challenge Open on the Challenge Tour.

Professional wins (7)

Challenge Tour wins (1)

Challenge Tour playoff record (1–0)

PGA EuroPro Tour wins (2)

MENA Tour wins (1)

Hi5 Pro Tour wins (3)

References

External links

English male golfers
Missouri Tigers men's golfers
European Tour golfers
Sportspeople from Norwich
1988 births
Living people